HP Softbench was one of the first plug-in Integrated Development Environment (IDE) tool based on the UNIX operating system, UNIX tools and the X Window System.

The main ideas were:
 Tools and data can reside on many different systems across the network
 Tool communication using a Broadcast Message Server
 Common user interface
 Integrated help facility
 Tool Slots
 Encapsulator: tool for encapsulate any CASE tool into a Tool Slot if it supports standard I/O.

History 
SoftBench was released in 1989 and presented in the June 1990 HP Journal. It was an early adoption of some of the IDE ideas that are common today in well known IDEs like Eclipse.

References 

HP Softbench has reserved ports 6110-6111 in the IANA list of port assignments List of TCP and UDP port numbers

Integrated development environments